Tselinograd District is the district that surrounds the city and country capital of Astana in northern Kazakhstan. The administrative center of the district is the selo of Akmol. Population:

References

Districts of Kazakhstan
Akmola Region